Sa'a (also known as South Malaita and Apae'aa) is an Oceanic language spoken on Small Malaita and Ulawa Island in the Solomon Islands.

Phonology
The following is listed below:

Consonants

Vowels

References

External links
Palona Haalu Ana Nau Maai Sa'a (1979) A Liturgy for Melanesia in Sa'a, digitized by Richard Mammana and Charles Wohlers
Materials on Karnai are included in the open access Arthur Capell collection (AC2) held by Paradisec.

Malaita languages